Elhiwar ElTounsi is an Arabic-language television channel in Tunisia. In March 2015 it was the most widely watched television channel in Tunisia, with a 26.7% market share.

The channel was launched in 2003 by Tahar Ben Hassin, a left-wing émigré in Paris, as an unlicensed satellite station broadcasting political programmes opposed to the Ben Ali regime. After the Tunisian Revolution the channel relocated to the Manouba suburb of Tunis, switching to digital terrestrial broadcast and gradually becoming a mainstream television channel. In 2014 the founder sold the channel to a group of investors headed by Asma Fehri.

References

External links
 Official website

Television stations in Tunisia